The FTSE SmallCap Index is an index of small market capitalisation companies consisting of the 351st to the 619th largest-listed companies on the London Stock Exchange main market. The index, which is maintained by FTSE Russell, a subsidiary of the London Stock Exchange Group, is a constituent of the FTSE All-Share Index which is an index of all 620 companies listed on the main market of the LSE.

This Index value is re-calculated in real-time and published every minute.

See also
 FTSE 100
 FTSE 250

References

British stock market indices
FTSE Group stock market indices